Muitzes Kill is a stream in the U.S. state of New York.

Muitzes Kill is a name derived from Dutch most likely meaning "mice creek".

References

Rivers of Rensselaer County, New York
Rivers of New York (state)